John Edward McGinness (born November 19, 1943), is an American physicist and physician. McGinness worked in the fields of organic electronics and nanotechnology.

Education

McGinness studied physics at the University of Houston, and after his B.S. in 1966 he received his PhD in Nuclear Physics, Material Science, and Space Science at Rice University in 1970.

He received his MD from the University of Texas Health Science Center at Houston (UTHealth) in 1985 and worked in internal medicine for one year, changing to psychiatry and working at the Department of Psychiatry, UTHealth, from 1989 to 1992. He authored roughly 40 research publications, book chapters, and presentations.

Work
John McGinness materially contributed to the modern field of organic electronics.
 

In 1972, while working at the Metallurgy department at Youngstown State University, McGinness suggested  that electronic conduction in melanins (polyacetylene, polypyrrole, and polyaniline "blacks" and their copolymers) is analogous to conduction in amorphous solids such as the chalcogenide glasses.   This area was originally pioneered by Sir Nevill Mott,  among others.  That is, it involves such things as mobility gaps,  phonon-assisted hopping, polarons, quantum tunneling, and so forth.

From Youngstown, McGinness moved to the Physics Department of The University of Texas M. D. Anderson Cancer Center. The department had an interest in the physical properties of melanin as a possible hook to treating melanoma. While of enormous importance now, this area was a research backwater at the time. This is why the putative first molecular electronic device came from a cancer hospital.

The chalcogenide glasses show "switching",  in which an applied "threshold voltage" reversibly switches a material from a low-conductivity "OFF" state to a high-conductivity "ON' state.  The similarity of conduction mechanisms suggested that the melanins might also demonstrate voltage-controlled switching.  Following this lead,  McGinness and his MD Anderson coworkers   constructed  a voltage-controlled switch incorporating melanin as its active element .  They also further characterized its electronic behavior.
  
Since he was at a cancer research institute, McGinness' other interests included the role of free radicals in the action and toxicity of the anticancer drugs cisplatin, adriamycin, and bleomycin. He was the first to show that the kidney toxicity of cisplatin involves reactive oxygen species.   Some of this work was done with Harry Demopoulos. McGinness was also involved in the dielectric spectroscopy of water bound to membranes. This was related to the future development of magnetic resonance imaging.

References

Further reading

John McGinness, Proctor, P.H., Harry Demopoulos, Hokansen, J.A. and Van, N.T. In vivo evidence for superoxide and peroxide production by adriamycin and cis-platinum. In: Pathology of Oxygen. A. Author, (Ed.). Academic Press, New York, 1982, pp. 191–202.
McGinness J, Kishimoto A, Hollister LE. Avoiding neurotoxicity with lithium-carbamazepine combinations. Psychopharmacol Bull. 1990;26(2):181-4.
McGinness JE, Grossie B Jr, Proctor PH, Benjamin RS, Gulati OP, Hokanson JA. Effect of dose schedule of vitamin E and hydroxethylruticide on intestinal toxicity induced by adriamycin. Physiol Chem Phys Med NMR. 1986;18(1):17-24.
McGinness J. A new view of pigmented neurons. J Theor Biol. 1985 Aug 7;115(3):475-6.
Gulati OP, Nordmann H, Aellig A, Maignan MF, McGinness J. Protective effects of O-(beta-hydroxyethyl)-rutosides (HR) against adriamycin-induced toxicity in rats. Arch Int Pharmacodyn Ther. 1985 Feb;273(2):323-34.
Schrauzer GN, McGinness JE, Ishmael D, Bell LJ. Alcoholism and cancer. I. Effects of long-term exposure to alcohol on spontaneous mammary adenocarcinoma and prolactin levels in C3H/St mice. J Stud Alcohol. 1979 Mar;40(3):240-6.
Pietronigro DD, McGinness JE, Koren MJ, Crippa R, Seligman ML, Harry Demopoulos. Spontaneous generation of adriamycin semiquinone radicals at physiologic pH. Physiol Chem Phys. 1979;11(5):405-14.
McGinness JE, Crippa PR, Kirkpatrick DS, Proctor PH. Reversible and irreversible changes in hydrogen ion titration curves of melanins. Physiol Chem Phys. 1979;11(3):217-23.
Kirkpatrick DS, McGinness JE, Moorhead WD, Corry PM, Proctor PH. High-frequency dielectric spectroscopy of concentrated membrane suspensions. Biophys J. 1978 Oct;24(1):243-5.

External links
 The Chip Collection - Proctor McGinness Introduction, Smithsonian Institution

Living people
Organic semiconductors
Molecular electronics
Conductive polymers
1943 births
University of Texas Health Science Center at Houston alumni
University of Houston alumni
Rice University alumni
University of Texas MD Anderson Cancer Center faculty